This is a list of fractal topics, by Wikipedia page, See also list of dynamical systems and differential equations topics.

1/f noise
Apollonian gasket
Attractor
Box-counting dimension
Cantor distribution
Cantor dust
Cantor function
Cantor set
Cantor space
Chaos theory
Coastline
Constructal theory
Dimension
Dimension theory
Dragon curve
Fatou set
Fractal
Fractal antenna
Fractal art
Fractal compression
Fractal flame
Fractal landscape
Fractal transform
Fractint
Graftal
Iterated function system
Horseshoe map
How Long Is the Coast of Britain? Statistical Self-Similarity and Fractional Dimension
Julia set
Koch snowflake
L-system
Lebesgue covering dimension
Lévy C curve
Lévy flight
List of fractals by Hausdorff dimension
Lorenz attractor
Lyapunov fractal
Mandelbrot set
Menger sponge
Minkowski–Bouligand dimension
Multifractal analysis
Olbers' paradox
Perlin noise
Power law
Rectifiable curve
Scale-free network
Self-similarity
Sierpinski carpet
Sierpiński curve
Sierpinski triangle
Space-filling curve
T-square (fractal)
Topological dimension

Fractals